José Santana may refer to:

 José Santana (economist) (born 1962), Dominican economist
 José Santana (karateka) (born 1957)
 José Antonio Santana (born 1981), Spanish footballer